Hédi (and its variant Hedi) is a unisex given name. People with the name include:

People

Male

First name
Hédi Annabi (1943–2010), Tunisian diplomat 
Hédi Baccouche (1930–2020), Tunisian politician
El Hedi Belameiri (born 1991), Algerian football player
Hédi Berkhissa (1972–1997), Tunisian football player
Hedi Boukhris (born 1986), Tunisian football player
Hédi Bouraoui (born 1932)Tunisian Canadian poet, novelist and academic
Hedi Bousarsar (born 1961), Tunisian volleyball player
Hedi Dhaoui (born 1935), Tunisian athlete
Hedi Gharbi (born 1969), Tunisian sailor
Hédi Jouini (1909–1990), Tunisian musician
Hédi Kaddour (born 1945), French poet and novelist
Hedi Khalfa (born 1994), Tunisian football player
Hédi Khayachi (1882–1948), Tunisian painter
Hedi El Kholti (born 1967, Moroccan American writer and editor 
Hédi Lakhoua (1872–1949), Tunisian politician
Hédi Mabrouk (1921–2000), Tunisian diplomat and politician
Hédi Majdoub (born 1969), Tunisian politician
Hedi Mattoussi, Tunisian-American materials scientist
Hedi Amara Nouira  (1911–1993), Tunisian politician
Hédi Saidi (1897–1948), Tunisian politician
Hedi Slimane (born 1968), French photographer and fashion designer
Hedi Souid (born 1983), Tunisian rugby player
Hédi Teraoui (born 1989), Tunisian racewalker 
Hedi Turki (1922–2019), Tunisian artist of Turkish origin
Hedi Zaiem (born 1976), Tunisian media personality

Middle name
Mohamed Hédi Chérif (1932–2021), Tunisian historian and academic
Mohamed Hedi Gaaloul (born 1989), Tunisian football player

Female
Hedi Beeler (born 1931), Swiss alpine skier
Hedi Flitz (1900–1994), German politician 
Hédi Fried (1924–2022), Swedish-Romanian author and psychologist
Hedi Kyle (born 1937), German-born American book artist and educator
Hedi Lang (1931–2004), Swiss politician
Hedi Schoop (1906–1995), Swiss-born German cabaret artist, sculptor and painter
Hedi Stadlen (1916–2004), Austrian Jewish philosopher and political activist
Hédi Temessy (1925–2001) Hungarian actress
Hédi Váradi (1929–1987) Hungarian actress

Arabic masculine given names
Hungarian feminine given names
Jewish feminine given names
Unisex given names